Paolo Vallaresso (5 March 1660 – 23 November 1723) was a Roman Catholic prelate who served as Bishop of Concordia (1693–1723).

Biography
Paolo Vallaresso was born in Venice, Italy on 5 March 1660.
He was ordained a deacon on 21 April 1685 and ordained a priest on 23 November 1692. He held the degree of Doctor in utroque iure from the University of Padua.

On 9 March 1693, he was appointed Bishop of Concordia by Pope Innocent XII.
On 15 March 1693, he was consecrated bishop by Gasparo Carpegna, Cardinal-Priest of Santa Maria in Trastevere, with Petrus Draghi Bartoli, Titular Patriarch of Alexandria, and Michelangelo Mattei, Titular Archbishop of Hadrianopolis in Haemimonto, serving as co-consecrators. 
He served as Bishop of Concordia until his death on 23 November 1723.

References

External links and additional sources
 (for Chronology of Bishops) 
 (for Chronology of Bishops) 

17th-century Roman Catholic bishops in the Republic of Venice
18th-century Roman Catholic bishops in the Republic of Venice
Bishops appointed by Pope Innocent XII
1660 births
1723 deaths